Morgan County Courthouse was a historic courthouse building located at Berkeley Springs, Morgan County, West Virginia.  It was built in 1907 and was a two-story, three-bay, building constructed of yellow brick with limestone accents in the Neoclassical style. It featured a centered, octagonal clock tower that extended above the second story flat roof and dominated the main elevation.  Also on the property are an annex (c. 1920) and former jail (1939).  The courthouse building was damaged by fire in 2006 and was subsequently demolished.

It was listed on the National Register of Historic Places in 2005.

References

Bath (Berkeley Springs), West Virginia
Courthouses on the National Register of Historic Places in West Virginia
Neoclassical architecture in West Virginia
Government buildings completed in 1907
Buildings and structures in Morgan County, West Virginia
National Register of Historic Places in Morgan County, West Virginia
Demolished buildings and structures in West Virginia
Buildings and structures demolished in 2006
Clock towers in West Virginia